De la Rose is a surname. Notable people with the surname include:

Erik de la Rose (born 1993), Swedish ice hockey player
Jacob de la Rose (born 1995), Swedish ice hockey player, brother of Erik

See also
De La Rose, racehorse
Larose (surname)
La Rose (surname)